The Bodva is a 110-km long river in Slovakia and Hungary. Its source is in the Slovak Ore Mountains. The river crosses the border with Hungary near Turňa nad Bodvou, and it flows into the river Sajó in Boldva, north of Miskolc. Two of its tributaries are the Turňa and the Ida.

The Bodva flows on the eastern edge of a karstic rock system, therefore it has an unsymmetrical drainage pattern. Up to Medzev, where the river reaches the karst region, and on its left side the Bodva river has a typical treelike river system.

References

Rivers of Slovakia
Rivers of Hungary
International rivers of Europe